Domingo Namuncura Serrano (born 1952) is a Chilean social worker and politician of Mapuche descent who served as Ambassador of his country in Guatemala.

References

External Links
 Profile at El Quinto Poder 

1952 births
Living people 
Chilean people 
Chilean people of Mapuche descent
21st-century Chilean politicians
Pontifical Catholic University of Valparaíso alumni
Academy of Christian Humanism University alumni
Party for Democracy (Chile) politicians